The 55th National Film Awards, presented by Directorate of Film Festivals, the organisation set up by Ministry of Information and Broadcasting, India to felicitate the best of Indian Cinema released in the year 2007.

Three different committees were instituted in order to judge the various entries for feature film, non-feature film and best writing on cinema sections; headed by National award winner director, Sai Paranjpye, for feature films and Ashoke Viswanathan along with Namita Gokhale for non-feature films and best writing on cinema sections, respectively.

Each chairperson announced the award on 7 September 2009 for their respective sections and award ceremony took place at Vigyan Bhavan, New Delhi with President of India, Pratibha Patil giving away the awards on 21 October 2009.

Awards 

Awards were divided into feature films, non-feature films and books written on Indian cinema.

Lifetime Achievement Award 

Lifetime achievement award is given to the prominent personality from the Indian film industry for the significant contributions given.

Juries 

A committee consisting four eminent personalities from Indian film industry was appointed to evaluate the lifetime achievement award, Dadasaheb Phalke Award. Following were the jury members:

 Jury Members
 Akkineni Nageswara RaoYash ChopraVijaya MulayAmjad Ali Khan

Feature films 

Feature films were awarded at All India as well as regional level. For 55th National Film Awards, a Tamil film, Kanchivaram won the National Film Award for Best Feature Film; whereas a Hindi film, Gandhi, My Father won the maximum number of awards (3). Following were the awards given in each category:

Juries 

A committee headed by Sai Paranjpye was appointed to evaluate the feature films awards. Following were the jury members:

 Jury Members
 Sai Paranjpye (Chairperson)Nemai GhoshManju BorahAhsan MuzidArup MannaMohan SharmaK. S. Sivaraman
 Rajendra Narayan TalakKesari HarvooErvelle MenezesSibi MalayilSunny JosephSatya PaulPratibha Prahlad

All India Award 

Following were the awards given:

Golden Lotus Award 

Official name: Swarna Kamal

All the awardees are awarded with 'Golden Lotus Award (Swarna Kamal)', a certificate and cash prize.

Silver Lotus Award 

Official name: Rajat Kamal

All the awardees are awarded with 'Silver Lotus Award (Rajat Kamal)', a certificate and cash prize.

Regional Awards 

The award is given to best film in the regional languages in India.

Best Feature Film in Each of the Language Other Than Those Specified In the Schedule VIII of the Constitution

Non-Feature Films 

Films made in any Indian language shot on 16 mm, 35 mm or in a wider gauge or digital format and released on either film format or video/digital but certified by the Central Board of Film Certification as a documentary/newsreel/fiction are eligible for non-feature film section.

Juries 

A committee headed by Ashoke Viswanathan was appointed to evaluate the non-feature films awards. Following were the jury members:

 Jury Members
 Ashoke Viswanathan (Chairperson)Prabhu RadhakrishnanRajendra JanglayJasmine K. RoyAshok OgraRamesh Asher

Golden Lotus Award 

Official name: Swarna Kamal

All the awardees are awarded with 'Golden Lotus Award (Swarna Kamal)', a certificate and cash prize.

Silver Lotus Award 

Official name: Rajat Kamal

All the awardees are awarded with 'Silver Lotus Award (Rajat Kamal)' and cash prize.

Best Writing on Cinema 

The awards aim at encouraging study and appreciation of cinema as an art form and dissemination of information and critical appreciation of this art-form through publication of books, articles, reviews etc.

Juries 

A committee headed by Namita Gokhale was appointed to evaluate the writing on Indian cinema. Following were the jury members:

 Jury Members
 Namita Gokhale (Chairperson)Jerry PintoG. P. Ramachandran

Golden Lotus Award 
Official name: Swarna Kamal

All the awardees are awarded with 'Golden Lotus Award (Swarna Kamal)' and cash prize.

Awards not given 

Following were the awards not given as no film was found to be suitable for the award:

 Best Scientific Film
 Best Arts / Cultural Film
 Best Environment Film Including Agriculture
 Best Promotional Film
 Best Agricultural Film
 Best Non-Feature Animation Film
 Best Feature Film in Assamese
 Best Feature Film in Manipuri
 Best Feature Film in Oriya
 Best Feature Film in Punjabi
 Best Feature Film in Telugu
 Best Exploration / Adventure Film

References

External links 
 National Film Awards Archives
 Official Page for Directorate of Film Festivals, India

National Film Awards (India) ceremonies
2009 Indian film awards